Algibacter undariae is a Gram-negative, rod-shaped and motile  bacterium from the genus of Algibacter.

References

Flavobacteria
Bacteria described in 2013